The Emerald Wand of Oz is a 2005 book by Sherwood Smith and is a continuation of the Oz series that was started by L. Frank Baum in 1900 and continued by his many successors. The book is illustrated by William Stout and published by HarperCollins.

The novel concerns two relatives of Dorothy Gale, Em and Dory, who find themselves in Oz just as Bastinda, a new Wicked Witch of the West, threatens the citizens of Oz.

The Emerald Wand of Oz is stated to be the 46th book in the series and the first of four Oz novels that have been commissioned by the Baum Family Trust. It is followed by Trouble Under Oz and Sky Pyrates Over Oz, all by Sherwood Smith.

External links
 On The Emerald Wand of Oz

2005 American novels
2005 children's books
2005 fantasy novels
HarperCollins books
Novels by Sherwood Smith
Oz (franchise) books